, known professionally as , was a Japanese actress.

Career
She was born Igarashi Aya, and assumed the stage name Sei Ashina. Prior to her acting career, Ashina was a model. She made her acting debut in the 2002 Tokyo Broadcasting System Television series The Tail of Happiness (しあわせのシッポ), modeling that year in magazines including Shogakukan's CanCam and Shueisha's Pinky, and was best known for starring as Hime in Kamen Rider Hibiki. She was also known for her role as The Girl, an unnamed concubine, in Silk (2007).

Ashina died on September 14, 2020, at age 36.  Her body was found at her home in Shinjuku in a suspected suicide.

Filmography

Movies
Sekai no Owari (2004)
Kamen Rider Hibiki & The Seven Senki (2005) - Hime (姫)
Silk (2007) - The Girl
Tatoe Sekai ga Owattemo (2007)
Mayu-Kokoro no Hoshi- (2007)
Kamui Gaiden (2009)
NANASE: The Psychic Wanderers (2010)
Tale of Genji: A Thousand Year Engima (2011)
Killing For The Prosecution (2018)
Impossibility Defense (2018)
Perfect World (2018)
AI Hōkai (2020)

Television
 Stand Up!! (2003)
  (2004)
 Kamen Rider Hibiki (2005)
  (2006)
 Tsubasa No Oreta Tenshitachi (2007)
 Swan no Baka (2007)
 Giragira (2008)
  (2008)
 Saru Lock (2009)
 Untouchable (2009)
 Bloody Monday 2 (2010)
 Watashi wa Shadow (2011)
 Nobunaga no Chef (2013)
 Nobunaga no Chef 2 (2014)
 The Emperor's Cook (2015)
 Specialist (2016)

References

External links
HORIPRO SQUARE Talent Profile 

Japanese voice actresses
Japanese female models
Japanese gravure models
1983 births
2020 deaths
People from Fukushima, Fukushima
People from Shinjuku
Japanese film actresses
Actors from Fukushima Prefecture
Japanese television actresses
21st-century Japanese actresses
Actresses from Tokyo
2020 suicides
Suicides in Tokyo